The action of Elouges on 24 August 1914 was fought during the First World War.  Following the Battle of Mons the British Expeditionary Force was withdrawing, closely followed by the advancing German Army. The British 5th Division was assisted by the 2nd Cavalry Brigade and 3rd Cavalry Brigade.

During the action the 4th (Royal Irish) Dragoon Guards and 'A' Squadron, the 9th (Queen's Royal) Lancers charged the German guns. Major Ernest Alexander of the Royal Artillery and Captain Francis Grenfell of the 9th Lancers were awarded the Victoria Cross for saving an artillery battery while under fire. Eventually the 1st Battalion Cheshire Regiment was surrounded and destroyed.

References

Conflicts in 1914
Battles of the Western Front (World War I)
Battles of World War I involving Germany
Battles of World War I involving the United Kingdom
Action of Elouges
August 1914 events